Banwell Caves are a 1.7-hectare geological and biological Site of Special Scientific Interest near the village of Banwell, North Somerset, England notified in 1963.

The site comprises two caves, called 'Banwell Bone Cave' and 'Banwell Stalactite Cave', which lie within the grounds of a large house, at the western end of Banwell Hill. The caves contain barite deposits, which are found in greater abundance and variety here than at any other site in the Mendip Hills, and are used as a hibernation site by greater horseshoe bats (Rhinolophus ferrumequinum).

The site also has several grottos and follies, including the Pebble summerhouse, Druid's Temple, an osteoicon (or bone repository) and Banwell Tower which was completed in 1840.

History
The first cave to be discovered was the Stalactite Cave in 1757. This was opened in 1824 as a show cave to raise money for the local school. In an attempt to make access easier, a tunnel was dug into the hill during which the bone cave was discovered in 1825.

The estate was owned by George Henry Law as Bishop of Bath and Wells, who thought the bones which were found were those of animals drowned in the flood at the time of Noah's Ark described in the Book of Genesis. The bishop had paths and folly buildings created for visitors and built a small cottage, which later became his retirement home.

Since the 1970s, preservation and restoration work has been undertaken.

Bone Cave
It is approached through an early 19th-century archway. It contains an assemblage of bones of mammals (including bear, deer, ox,  bison and reindeer) from the Pleistocene era (approximately 80,000 years ago). The cave has a large hole in the roof and is believed to have been used as a pitfall trap.

The Bone Cave was discovered in 1824 during attempts to drive a horizontal passage into the Stalactite Cave. Archaeological excavation was carried out by William Beard, with some of the bones being removed, but many being left in the cave in stacks.

Stalactite Cave
Although no stream now runs through the cave, there is a deep lake in one of the chambers. The Stalactite Cave was entered by miners in 1757, and was a show cave between about 1824 and 1864.

Banwell Tower

During World War II, it was used as a lookout tower by the Home Guard. By the 1960s it was in a  poor state of repair and could no longer be seen above the growing treetops. Local conservation groups undertook conservation work, and it was reopened to the public in 1996. It is a Grade II listed building.

See also
 Banwell Ochre Caves
 Caves of the Mendip Hills

References

External links
 Banwell Caves Heritage Group
 Mendip Cave Registry and Archive: Banwell Caves

Bat roosts
Caves of Somerset
Limestone caves
Sites of Special Scientific Interest in Avon
Sites of Special Scientific Interest notified in 1963
Sites of Special Scientific Interest in Somerset
Wild caves